Baseball is a bat-and-ball sport played between two teams of nine players each, taking turns batting and fielding. The game occurs over the course of several plays, with each play generally beginning when a player on the fielding team, called the pitcher, throws a ball that a player on the batting team, called the batter, tries to hit with a bat. The objective of the offensive team (batting team) is to hit the ball into the field of play, away from the other team's players, allowing its players to run the bases, having them advance counter-clockwise around four bases to score what are called "runs". The objective of the defensive team (referred to as the fielding team) is to prevent batters from becoming runners, and to prevent runners' advance around the bases. A run is scored when a runner legally advances around the bases in order and touches home plate (the place where the player started as a batter).

The principal objective of the batting team is to have a player reach first base safely; this generally occurs either when the batter hits the ball and reaches first base before an opponent retrieves the ball and touches the base, or when the pitcher persists in throwing the ball out of the batter's reach. Players on the batting team who reach first base without being called "out" can attempt to advance to subsequent bases as a runner, either immediately or during teammates' turns batting. The fielding team tries to prevent runs by getting batters or runners "out", which forces them out of the field of play. The pitcher can get the batter out by throwing three pitches which result in strikes, while fielders can get the batter out by catching a batted ball before it touches the ground, and can get a runner out by tagging them with the ball while the runner is not touching a base.

The opposing teams switch back and forth between batting and fielding; the batting team's turn to bat is over once the fielding team records three outs. One turn batting for each team constitutes an inning. A game is usually composed of nine innings, and the team with the greater number of runs at the end of the game wins. Most games end after the ninth inning, but if scores are tied at that point, extra innings are usually played. Baseball has no game clock, though some competitions feature pace-of-play regulations such as the pitch clock to shorten game time.

Baseball evolved from older bat-and-ball games already being played in England by the mid-18th century. This game was brought by immigrants to North America, where the modern version developed. Baseball's American origins, as well as its reputation as a source of escapism during troubled points in American history such as the American Civil War and the Great Depression, have led the sport to receive the moniker of "America's Pastime"; since the late 19th century, it has been unofficially recognized as the national sport of the United States, though in modern times is considered less popular than other sports, such as American football. In addition to North America, baseball is considered the most popular sport in parts of Central and South America, the Caribbean, and East Asia, particularly in Japan, South Korea, and Taiwan.

In Major League Baseball (MLB), the highest level of professional baseball in the United States and Canada, teams are divided into the National League (NL) and American League (AL), each with three divisions: East, West, and Central. The MLB champion is determined by playoffs that culminate in the World Series. The top level of play is similarly split in Japan between the Central and Pacific Leagues and in Cuba between the West League and East League. The World Baseball Classic, organized by the World Baseball Softball Confederation, is the major international competition of the sport and attracts the top national teams from around the world. Baseball was played at the Olympic Games from 1992 to 2008, and was reinstated in 2020.

Rules and gameplay

A baseball game is played between two teams, each usually composed of nine players, that take turns playing offense (batting and baserunning) and defense (pitching and fielding). A pair of turns, one at bat and one in the field, by each team constitutes an inning. A game consists of nine innings (seven innings at the high school level and in doubleheaders in college, Minor League Baseball and, since the 2020 season, Major League Baseball; and six innings at the Little League level). One team—customarily the visiting team—bats in the top, or first half, of every inning. The other team—customarily the home team—bats in the bottom, or second half, of every inning. The goal of the game is to score more points (runs) than the other team. The players on the team at bat attempt to score runs by touching all four bases, in order, set at the corners of the square-shaped baseball diamond. A player bats at home plate and must attempt to safely reach a base before proceeding, counterclockwise, from first base, to second base, third base, and back home to score a run. The team in the field attempts to prevent runs from scoring by recording outs, which remove opposing players from offensive action, until their next turn at bat comes up again. When three outs are recorded, the teams switch roles for the next half-inning. If the score of the game is tied after nine innings, extra innings are played to resolve the contest. Many amateur games, particularly unorganized ones, involve different numbers of players and innings.

The game is played on a field whose primary boundaries, the foul lines, extend forward from home plate at 45-degree angles. The 90-degree area within the foul lines is referred to as fair territory; the 270-degree area outside them is foul territory. The part of the field enclosed by the bases and several yards beyond them is the infield; the area farther beyond the infield is the outfield. In the middle of the infield is a raised pitcher's mound, with a rectangular rubber plate (the rubber) at its center. The outer boundary of the outfield is typically demarcated by a raised fence, which may be of any material and height. The fair territory between home plate and the outfield boundary is baseball's field of play, though significant events can take place in foul territory, as well.

There are three basic tools of baseball: the ball, the bat, and the glove or mitt:
It has a rubber or cork center, wound in yarn and covered in white cowhide, with red stitching.
 The bat is a hitting tool, traditionally made of a single, solid piece of wood. Other materials are now commonly used for nonprofessional games.
 The glove or mitt is a fielding tool, made of padded leather with webbing between the fingers. As an aid in catching and holding onto the ball, it takes various shapes to meet the specific needs of different fielding positions.
Protective helmets are also standard equipment for all batters.

At the beginning of each half-inning, the nine players of the fielding team arrange themselves around the field. One of them, the pitcher, stands on the pitcher's mound. The pitcher begins the pitching delivery with one foot on the rubber, pushing off it to gain velocity when throwing toward home plate. Another fielding team player, the catcher, squats on the far side of home plate, facing the pitcher. The rest of the fielding team faces home plate, typically arranged as four infielders—who set up along or within a few yards outside the imaginary lines (basepaths) between first, second, and third base—and three outfielders. In the standard arrangement, there is a first baseman positioned several steps to the left of first base, a second baseman to the right of second base, a shortstop to the left of second base, and a third baseman to the right of third base. The basic outfield positions are left fielder, center fielder, and right fielder. With the exception of the catcher, all fielders are required to be in fair territory when the pitch is delivered. A neutral umpire sets up behind the catcher. Other umpires will be distributed around the field as well.

Play starts with a member of the batting team, the batter, standing in either of the two batter's boxes next to home plate, holding a bat. The batter waits for the pitcher to throw a pitch (the ball) toward home plate, and attempts to hit the ball with the bat. The catcher catches pitches that the batter does not hit—as a result of either electing not to swing or failing to connect—and returns them to the pitcher. A batter who hits the ball into the field of play must drop the bat and begin running toward first base, at which point the player is referred to as a runner (or, until the play is over, a batter-runner). A batter-runner who reaches first base without being put out is said to be safe and is on base. A batter-runner may choose to remain at first base or attempt to advance to second base or even beyond—however far the player believes can be reached safely. A player who reaches base despite proper play by the fielders has recorded a hit. A player who reaches first base safely on a hit is credited with a single. If a player makes it to second base safely as a direct result of a hit, it is a double; third base, a triple. If the ball is hit in the air within the foul lines over the entire outfield (and outfield fence, if there is one), or if the batter-runner otherwise safely circles all the bases, it is a home run: the batter and any runners on base may all freely circle the bases, each scoring a run. This is the most desirable result for the batter. The ultimate and most desirable result possible for a batter would be to hit a home run while all three bases are occupied or "loaded", thus scoring four runs on a single hit. This is called a grand slam. A player who reaches base due to a fielding mistake is not credited with a hit—instead, the responsible fielder is charged with an error.

Any runners already on base may attempt to advance on batted balls that land, or contact the ground, in fair territory, before or after the ball lands. A runner on first base must attempt to advance if a ball lands in play, as only one runner may occupy a base at any given time. If a ball hit into play rolls foul before passing through the infield, it becomes dead and any runners must return to the base they occupied when the play began. If the ball is hit in the air and caught before it lands, the batter has flied out and any runners on base may attempt to advance only if they tag up (contact the base they occupied when the play began, as or after the ball is caught). Runners may also attempt to advance to the next base while the pitcher is in the process of delivering the ball to home plate; a successful effort is a stolen base.

A pitch that is not hit into the field of play is called either a strike or a ball. A batter against whom three strikes are recorded strikes out. A batter against whom four balls are recorded is awarded a base on balls or walk, a free advance to first base. (A batter may also freely advance to first base if the batter's body or uniform is struck by a pitch outside the strike zone, provided the batter does not swing and attempts to avoid being hit.) Crucial to determining balls and strikes is the umpire's judgment as to whether a pitch has passed through the strike zone, a conceptual area above home plate extending from the midpoint between the batter's shoulders and belt down to the hollow of the knee. Any pitch which does not pass through the strike zone is called a ball, unless the batter either swings and misses at the pitch, or hits the pitch into foul territory; an exception generally occurs if the ball is hit into foul territory when the batter already has two strikes, in which case neither a ball nor a strike is called.

While the team at bat is trying to score runs, the team in the field is attempting to record outs. In addition to the strikeout and flyout, common ways a member of the batting team may be put out include the ground out, force out, and tag out. These occur either when a runner is forced to advance to a base, and a fielder with possession of the ball reaches that base before the runner does, or the runner is touched by the ball, held in a fielder's hand, while not on a base. (The batter-runner is always forced to advance to first base, and any other runners must advance to the next base if a teammate is forced to advance to their base.) It is possible to record two outs in the course of the same play. This is called a double play. Three outs in one play, a triple play, is possible, though rare. Players put out or retired must leave the field, returning to their team's dugout or bench. A runner may be stranded on base when a third out is recorded against another player on the team. Stranded runners do not benefit the team in its next turn at bat as every half-inning begins with the bases empty.

An individual player's turn batting or plate appearance is complete when the player reaches base, hits a home run, makes an out, or hits a ball that results in the team's third out, even if it is recorded against a teammate. On rare occasions, a batter may be at the plate when, without the batter's hitting the ball, a third out is recorded against a teammate—for instance, a runner getting caught stealing (tagged out attempting to steal a base). A batter with this sort of incomplete plate appearance starts off the team's next turn batting; any balls or strikes recorded against the batter the previous inning are erased. A runner may circle the bases only once per plate appearance and thus can score at most a single run per batting turn. Once a player has completed a plate appearance, that player may not bat again until the eight other members of the player's team have all taken their turn at bat in the batting order. The batting order is set before the game begins, and may not be altered except for substitutions. Once a player has been removed for a substitute, that player may not reenter the game. Children's games often have more lenient rules, such as Little League rules, which allow players to be substituted back into the same game.

If the designated hitter (DH) rule is in effect, each team has a tenth player whose sole responsibility is to bat (and run). The DH takes the place of another player—almost invariably the pitcher—in the batting order, but does not field. Thus, even with the DH, each team still has a batting order of nine players and a fielding arrangement of nine players.

Personnel

Players 

The number of players on a baseball roster, or squad, varies by league and by the level of organized play. A Major League Baseball (MLB) team has a roster of 25 players with specific roles. A typical roster features the following players:
 Eight position players: the catcher, four infielders, and three outfielders—all of whom play on a regular basis
 Five starting pitchers who constitute the team's pitching rotation or starting rotation
 Six relief pitchers, including one closer, who constitute the team's bullpen (named for the off-field area where pitchers warm up)
 One backup, or substitute, catcher
 Two backup infielders
 Two backup outfielders
 One pinch hitter, or a utility player, or a seventh reliever

Most baseball leagues worldwide have the DH rule, including the MLB, Japan's Pacific League, and Caribbean professional leagues, along with major American amateur organizations. The Central League in Japan does not have the rule and high-level minor league clubs connected to National League teams are not required to field a DH. In leagues that apply the designated hitter rule, a typical team has nine offensive regulars (including the DH), five starting pitchers, seven or eight relievers, a backup catcher, and two or three other reserve players.

Managers and coaches 
The manager, or head coach, oversees the team's major strategic decisions, such as establishing the starting rotation, setting the lineup, or batting order, before each game, and making substitutions during games—in particular, bringing in relief pitchers. Managers are typically assisted by two or more coaches; they may have specialized responsibilities, such as working with players on hitting, fielding, pitching, or strength and conditioning. At most levels of organized play, two coaches are stationed on the field when the team is at bat: the first base coach and third base coach, who occupy designated coaches' boxes, just outside the foul lines. These coaches assist in the direction of baserunners, when the ball is in play, and relay tactical signals from the manager to batters and runners, during pauses in play. In contrast to many other team sports, baseball managers and coaches generally wear their team's uniforms; coaches must be in uniform to be allowed on the field to confer with players during a game.

Umpires 
Any baseball game involves one or more umpires, who make rulings on the outcome of each play. At a minimum, one umpire will stand behind the catcher, to have a good view of the strike zone, and call balls and strikes. Additional umpires may be stationed near the other bases, thus making it easier to judge plays such as attempted force outs and tag outs. In MLB, four umpires are used for each game, one near each base. In the playoffs, six umpires are used: one at each base and two in the outfield along the foul lines.

Strategy 

Many of the pre-game and in-game strategic decisions in baseball revolve around a fundamental fact: in general, right-handed batters tend to be more successful against left-handed pitchers and, to an even greater degree, left-handed batters tend to be more successful against right-handed pitchers. A manager with several left-handed batters in the regular lineup, who knows the team will be facing a left-handed starting pitcher, may respond by starting one or more of the right-handed backups on the team's roster. During the late innings of a game, as relief pitchers and pinch hitters are brought in, the opposing managers will often go back and forth trying to create favorable matchups with their substitutions. The manager of the fielding team trying to arrange same-handed pitcher-batter matchups and the manager of the batting team trying to arrange opposite-handed matchups. With a team that has the lead in the late innings, a manager may remove a starting position player—especially one whose turn at bat is not likely to come up again—for a more skillful fielder (known as a defensive substitution).

Tactics

Pitching and fielding 

The tactical decision that precedes almost every play in a baseball game involves pitch selection. By gripping and then releasing the baseball in a certain manner, and by throwing it at a certain speed, pitchers can cause the baseball to break to either side, or downward, as it approaches the batter, thus creating differing pitches that can be selected. Among the resulting wide variety of pitches that may be thrown, the four basic types are the fastball, the changeup (or off-speed pitch), and two breaking balls—the curveball and the slider. Pitchers have different repertoires of pitches they are skillful at throwing. Conventionally, before each pitch, the catcher signals the pitcher what type of pitch to throw, as well as its general vertical and/or horizontal location. If there is disagreement on the selection, the pitcher may shake off the sign and the catcher will call for a different pitch.

With a runner on base and taking a lead, the pitcher may attempt a pickoff, a quick throw to a fielder covering the base to keep the runner's lead in check or, optimally, effect a tag out. Pickoff attempts, however, are subject to rules that severely restrict the pitcher's movements before and during the pickoff attempt. Violation of any one of these rules could result in the umpire calling a balk against the pitcher, which permits any runners on base to advance one base with impunity. If an attempted stolen base is anticipated, the catcher may call for a pitchout, a ball thrown deliberately off the plate, allowing the catcher to catch it while standing and throw quickly to a base. Facing a batter with a strong tendency to hit to one side of the field, the fielding team may employ a shift, with most or all of the fielders moving to the left or right of their usual positions. With a runner on third base, the infielders may play in, moving closer to home plate to improve the odds of throwing out the runner on a ground ball, though a sharply hit grounder is more likely to carry through a drawn-in infield.

Batting and baserunning 

Several basic offensive tactics come into play with a runner on first base, including the fundamental choice of whether to attempt a steal of second base. The hit and run is sometimes employed, with a skillful contact hitter, the runner takes off with the pitch, drawing the shortstop or second baseman over to second base, creating a gap in the infield for the batter to poke the ball through. The sacrifice bunt, calls for the batter to focus on making soft contact with the ball, so that it rolls a short distance into the infield, allowing the runner to advance into scoring position as the batter is thrown out at first. A batter, particularly one who is a fast runner, may also attempt to bunt for a hit. A sacrifice bunt employed with a runner on third base, aimed at bringing that runner home, is known as a squeeze play. With a runner on third and fewer than two outs, a batter may instead concentrate on hitting a fly ball that, even if it is caught, will be deep enough to allow the runner to tag up and score—a successful batter, in this case, gets credit for a sacrifice fly. In order to increase the chance of advancing a batter to first base via a walk, the manager will sometimes signal a batter who is ahead in the count (i.e., has more balls than strikes) to take, or not swing at, the next pitch. The batter's potential reward of reaching base (via a walk) exceeds the disadvantage if the next pitch is a strike.

History 

The evolution of baseball from older bat-and-ball games is difficult to trace with precision. Consensus once held that today's baseball is a North American development from the older game rounders, popular among children in Great Britain and Ireland. American baseball historian David Block suggests that the game originated in England; recently uncovered historical evidence supports this position. Block argues that rounders and early baseball were actually regional variants of each other, and that the game's most direct antecedents are the English games of stoolball and "tut-ball". The earliest known reference to baseball is in a 1744 British publication, A Little Pretty Pocket-Book, by John Newbery. Block discovered that the first recorded game of "Bass-Ball" took place in 1749 in Surrey, and featured the Prince of Wales as a player. This early form of the game was apparently brought to Canada by English immigrants.

By the early 1830s, there were reports of a variety of uncodified bat-and-ball games recognizable as early forms of baseball being played around North America. The first officially recorded baseball game in North America was played in Beachville, Ontario, Canada, on June 4, 1838. In 1845, Alexander Cartwright, a member of New York City's Knickerbocker Club, led the codification of the so-called Knickerbocker Rules, which in turn were based on rules developed in 1837 by William R. Wheaton of the Gotham Club. While there are reports that the New York Knickerbockers played games in 1845, the contest long recognized as the first officially recorded baseball game in U.S. history took place on June 19, 1846, in Hoboken, New Jersey: the "New York Nine" defeated the Knickerbockers, 23–1, in four innings. With the Knickerbocker code as the basis, the rules of modern baseball continued to evolve over the next half-century. By the time of the Civil War, baseball had begun to overtake its fellow bat-and-ball sport cricket in popularity within the United States, due in part to baseball being of a much shorter duration than the form of cricket played at the time, as well as the fact that troops during the Civil War did not need a specialized playing surface to play baseball, as they would have required for cricket.

In the United States

Establishment of professional leagues 
In the mid-1850s, a baseball craze hit the New York metropolitan area, and by 1856, local journals were referring to baseball as the "national pastime" or "national game". A year later, the sport's first governing body, the National Association of Base Ball Players, was formed. In 1867, it barred participation by African Americans. The more formally structured National League was founded in 1876. Professional Negro leagues formed, but quickly folded. In 1887, softball, under the name of indoor baseball or indoor-outdoor, was invented as a winter version of the parent game. The National League's first successful counterpart, the American League, which evolved from the minor Western League, was established in 1893, and virtually all of the modern baseball rules were in place by then.

The National Agreement of 1903 formalized relations both between the two major leagues and between them and the National Association of Professional Base Ball Leagues, representing most of the country's minor professional leagues. The World Series, pitting the two major league champions against each other, was inaugurated that fall.  The Black Sox Scandal of the 1919 World Series led to the formation of the office of the Commissioner of Baseball. The first commissioner, Kenesaw Mountain Landis, was elected in 1920. That year also saw the founding of the Negro National League; the first significant Negro league, it would operate until 1931. For part of the 1920s, it was joined by the Eastern Colored League.

Rise of Ruth and racial integration 

Compared with the present, professional baseball in the early 20th century was lower-scoring, and pitchers were more dominant. The so-called dead-ball era ended in the early 1920s with several changes in rule and circumstance that were advantageous to hitters. Strict new regulations governed the ball's size, shape and composition, along with a new rule officially banning the spitball and other pitches that depended on the ball being treated or roughed-up with foreign substances, resulted in a ball that traveled farther when hit. The rise of the legendary player Babe Ruth, the first great power hitter of the new era, helped permanently alter the nature of the game. In the late 1920s and early 1930s, St. Louis Cardinals general manager Branch Rickey invested in several minor league clubs and developed the first modern farm system. A new Negro National League was organized in 1933; four years later, it was joined by the Negro American League. The first elections to the National Baseball Hall of Fame took place in 1936. In 1939, Little League Baseball was founded in Pennsylvania.

A large number of minor league teams disbanded when World War II led to a player shortage. Chicago Cubs owner Philip K. Wrigley led the formation of the All-American Girls Professional Baseball League to help keep the game in the public eye. The first crack in the unwritten agreement barring blacks from white-controlled professional ball occurred in 1945: Jackie Robinson was signed by the National League's Brooklyn Dodgers and began playing for their minor league team in Montreal. In 1947, Robinson broke the major leagues' color barrier when he debuted with the Dodgers. Latin-American players, largely overlooked before, also started entering the majors in greater numbers. In 1951, two Chicago White Sox, Venezuelan-born Chico Carrasquel and black Cuban-born Minnie Miñoso, became the first Hispanic All-Stars. Integration proceeded slowly: by 1953, only six of the 16 major league teams had a black player on the roster.

Attendance records and the age of steroids 

In 1975, the union's power—and players' salaries—began to increase greatly when the reserve clause was effectively struck down, leading to the free agency system. Significant work stoppages occurred in 1981 and 1994, the latter forcing the cancellation of the World Series for the first time in 90 years. Attendance had been growing steadily since the mid-1970s and in 1994, before the stoppage, the majors were setting their all-time record for per-game attendance. After play resumed in 1995, non-division-winning wild card teams became a permanent fixture of the post-season. Regular-season interleague play was introduced in 1997 and the second-highest attendance mark for a full season was set. In 2000, the National and American Leagues were dissolved as legal entities. While their identities were maintained for scheduling purposes (and the designated hitter distinction), the regulations and other functions—such as player discipline and umpire supervision—they had administered separately were consolidated under the rubric of MLB.

In 2001, Barry Bonds established the current record of 73 home runs in a single season. There had long been suspicions that the dramatic increase in power hitting was fueled in large part by the abuse of illegal steroids (as well as by the dilution of pitching talent due to expansion), but the issue only began attracting significant media attention in 2002 and there was no penalty for the use of performance-enhancing drugs before 2004. In 2007, Bonds became MLB's all-time home run leader, surpassing Hank Aaron, as total major league and minor league attendance both reached all-time highs.

Around the world 

With the historic popular moniker as "America's national pastime", baseball is well established in several other countries as well. As early as 1877, a professional league, the International Association, featured teams from both Canada and the US. While baseball is widely played in Canada and many minor league teams have been based in the country, the American major leagues did not include a Canadian club until 1969, when the Montreal Expos joined the National League as an expansion team. In 1977, the expansion Toronto Blue Jays joined the American League.

In 1847, American soldiers played what may have been the first baseball game in Mexico at Parque Los Berros in Xalapa, Veracruz. The first formal baseball league outside of the United States and Canada was founded in 1878 in Cuba, which maintains a rich baseball tradition. The Dominican Republic held its first islandwide championship tournament in 1912. Professional baseball tournaments and leagues began to form in other countries between the world wars, including the Netherlands (formed in 1922), Australia (1934), Japan (1936), Mexico (1937), and Puerto Rico (1938). The Japanese major leagues have long been considered the highest quality professional circuits outside of the United States.

After World War II, professional leagues were founded in many Latin American countries, most prominently Venezuela (1946) and the Dominican Republic (1955). Since the early 1970s, the annual Caribbean Series has matched the championship clubs from the four leading Latin American winter leagues: the Dominican Professional Baseball League, Mexican Pacific League, Puerto Rican Professional Baseball League, and Venezuelan Professional Baseball League. In Asia, South Korea (1982), Taiwan (1990) and China (2003) all have professional leagues.

The English football club, Aston Villa, were the first British baseball champions winning the 1890 National League of Baseball of Great Britain. The 2020 National Champions were the London Mets. Other European countries have seen professional leagues; the most successful, other than the Dutch league, is the Italian league, founded in 1948. In 2004, Australia won a surprise silver medal at the Olympic Games. The Confédération Européene de Baseball (European Baseball Confederation), founded in 1953, organizes a number of competitions between clubs from different countries. Other competitions between national teams, such as the Baseball World Cup and the Olympic baseball tournament, were administered by the International Baseball Federation (IBAF) from its formation in 1938 until its 2013 merger with the International Softball Federation to create the current joint governing body for both sports, the World Baseball Softball Confederation (WBSC).  Women's baseball is played on an organized amateur basis in numerous countries.

After being admitted to the Olympics as a medal sport beginning with the 1992 Games, baseball was dropped from the 2012 Summer Olympic Games at the 2005 International Olympic Committee meeting. It remained part of the 2008 Games. While the sport's lack of a following in much of the world was a factor, more important was MLB's reluctance to allow its players to participate during the major league season. MLB initiated the World Baseball Classic, scheduled to precede its season, partly as a replacement, high-profile international tournament. The inaugural Classic, held in March 2006, was the first tournament involving national teams to feature a significant number of MLB participants. The Baseball World Cup was discontinued after its 2011 edition in favor of an expanded World Baseball Classic.

Distinctive elements 
Baseball has certain attributes that set it apart from the other popular team sports in the countries where it has a following. All of these sports use a clock, play is less individual, and the variation between playing fields is not as substantial or important. The comparison between cricket and baseball demonstrates that many of baseball's distinctive elements are shared in various ways with its cousin sports.

No clock to kill 

In clock-limited sports, games often end with a team that holds the lead killing the clock rather than competing aggressively against the opposing team. In contrast, baseball has no clock, thus a team cannot win without getting the last batter out and rallies are not constrained by time. At almost any turn in any baseball game, the most advantageous strategy is some form of aggressive strategy. Whereas, in the case of multi-day Test and first-class cricket, the possibility of a draw (which occurs because of the restrictions on time, which like in baseball, originally did not exist) often encourages a team that is batting last and well behind, to bat defensively and run out the clock, giving up any faint chance at a win, to avoid an overall loss.

While nine innings has been the standard since the beginning of professional baseball, the duration of the average major league game has increased steadily through the years. At the turn of the 20th century, games typically took an hour and a half to play. In the 1920s, they averaged just less than two hours, which eventually ballooned to 2:38 in 1960. By 1997, the average American League game lasted 2:57 (National League games were about 10 minutes shorter—pitchers at the plate making for quicker outs than designated hitters). In 2004, Major League Baseball declared that its goal was an average game of 2:45. By 2014, though, the average MLB game took over three hours to complete. The lengthening of games is attributed to longer breaks between half-innings for television commercials, increased offense, more pitching changes, and a slower pace of play, with pitchers taking more time between each delivery, and batters stepping out of the box more frequently. Other leagues have experienced similar issues. In 2008, Nippon Professional Baseball took steps aimed at shortening games by 12 minutes from the preceding decade's average of 3:18.

In 2016, the average nine-inning playoff game in Major League baseball was 3 hours and 35 minutes. This was up 10 minutes from 2015 and 21 minutes from 2014. In response to the lengthening of the game, MLB decided from the 2023 season onward to institute a pitch clock rule to penalize batters and pitchers who take too much time between pitches.

Individual focus 

Although baseball is a team sport, individual players are often placed under scrutiny and pressure. While rewarding, it has sometimes been described as "ruthless" due to the pressure on the individual player. In 1915, a baseball instructional manual pointed out that every single pitch, of which there are often more than two hundred in a game, involves an individual, one-on-one contest: "the pitcher and the batter in a battle of wits". Pitcher, batter, and fielder all act essentially independent of each other. While coaching staffs can signal pitcher or batter to pursue certain tactics, the execution of the play itself is a series of solitary acts. If the batter hits a line drive, the outfielder is solely responsible for deciding to try to catch it or play it on the bounce and for succeeding or failing. The statistical precision of baseball is both facilitated by this isolation and reinforces it.

Cricket is more similar to baseball than many other team sports in this regard: while the individual focus in cricket is mitigated by the importance of the batting partnership and the practicalities of tandem running, it is enhanced by the fact that a batsman may occupy the wicket for an hour or much more. There is no statistical equivalent in cricket for the fielding error and thus less emphasis on personal responsibility in this area of play.

Uniqueness of parks 

Unlike those of most sports, baseball playing fields can vary significantly in size and shape. Major league teams often skirt even this rule. For example, at Minute Maid Park, which became the home of the Houston Astros in 2000, the Crawford Boxes in left field are only  from home plate. There are no rules at all that address the height of fences or other structures at the edge of the outfield.

Similarly, there are no regulations at all concerning the dimensions of foul territory. Thus a foul fly ball may be entirely out of play in a park with little space between the foul lines and the stands, but a foulout in a park with more expansive foul ground. A fence in foul territory that is close to the outfield line will tend to direct balls that strike it back toward the fielders, while one that is farther away may actually prompt more collisions, as outfielders run full speed to field balls deep in the corner. These variations can make the difference between a double and a triple or inside-the-park home run. The surface of the field is also unregulated. While the adjacent image shows a traditional field surfacing arrangement (and the one used by virtually all MLB teams with naturally surfaced fields), teams are free to decide what areas will be grassed or bare. Some fields—including several in MLB—use an artificial surface, such as AstroTurf. Surface variations can have a significant effect on how ground balls behave and are fielded as well as on baserunning. Similarly, the presence of a roof (seven major league teams play in stadiums with permanent or retractable roofs) can greatly affect how fly balls are played. While football and soccer players deal with similar variations of field surface and stadium covering, the size and shape of their fields are much more standardized. The area out-of-bounds on a football or soccer field does not affect play the way foul territory in baseball does, so variations in that regard are largely insignificant.

These physical variations create a distinctive set of playing conditions at each ballpark. Other local factors, such as altitude and climate, can also significantly affect play. A given stadium may acquire a reputation as a pitcher's park or a hitter's park, if one or the other discipline notably benefits from its unique mix of elements. The most exceptional park in this regard is Coors Field, home of the Colorado Rockies. Its high altitude— above sea level—is partly responsible for giving it the strongest hitter's park effect in the major leagues due to the low air pressure. Wrigley Field, home of the Chicago Cubs, is known for its fickle disposition: a pitcher's park when the strong winds off Lake Michigan are blowing in, it becomes more of a hitter's park when they are blowing out. The absence of a standardized field affects not only how particular games play out, but the nature of team rosters and players' statistical records. For example, hitting a fly ball  into right field might result in an easy catch on the warning track at one park, and a home run at another. A team that plays in a park with a relatively short right field, such as the New York Yankees, will tend to stock its roster with left-handed pull hitters, who can best exploit it. On the individual level, a player who spends most of his career with a team that plays in a hitter's park will gain an advantage in batting statistics over time—even more so if his talents are especially suited to the park.

Statistics 

Organized baseball lends itself to statistics to a greater degree than many other sports. Each play is discrete and has a relatively small number of possible outcomes. In the late 19th century, a former cricket player, English-born Henry Chadwick of Brooklyn, was responsible for the "development of the box score, tabular standings, the annual baseball guide, the batting average, and most of the common statistics and tables used to describe baseball." The statistical record is so central to the game's "historical essence" that Chadwick came to be known as Father Baseball. In the 1920s, American newspapers began devoting more and more attention to baseball statistics, initiating what journalist and historian Alan Schwarz describes as a "tectonic shift in sports, as intrigue that once focused mostly on teams began to go to individual players and their statistics lines."

The Official Baseball Rules administered by MLB require the official scorer to categorize each baseball play unambiguously. The rules provide detailed criteria to promote consistency. The score report is the official basis for both the box score of the game and the relevant statistical records. General managers, managers, and baseball scouts use statistics to evaluate players and make strategic decisions.

Certain traditional statistics are familiar to most baseball fans. The basic batting statistics include:
 At bats: plate appearances, excluding walks and hit by pitches—where the batter's ability is not fully tested—and sacrifices and sacrifice flies—where the batter intentionally makes an out in order to advance one or more baserunners
 Hits: times a base is reached safely, because of a batted, fair ball without a fielding error or fielder's choice
 Runs: times circling the bases and reaching home safely
 Runs batted in (RBIs): number of runners who scored due to a batter's action (including the batter, in the case of a home run), except when batter grounded into double play or reached on an error
 Home runs: hits on which the batter successfully touched all four bases, without the contribution of a fielding error
 Batting average: hits divided by at bats—the traditional measure of batting ability
The basic baserunning statistics include:
 Stolen bases: times advancing to the next base entirely due to the runner's own efforts, generally while the pitcher is preparing to deliver or delivering the ball
 Caught stealing: times tagged out while attempting to steal a base

The basic pitching statistics include:
 Wins: credited to pitcher on winning team who last pitched before the team took a lead that it never relinquished (a starting pitcher must pitch at least five innings to qualify for a win)
 Losses: charged to pitcher on losing team who was pitching when the opposing team took a lead that it never relinquished
 Saves: games where the pitcher enters a game led by the pitcher's team, finishes the game without surrendering the lead, is not the winning pitcher, and either (a) the lead was three runs or less when the pitcher entered the game; (b) the potential tying run was on base, at bat, or on deck; or (c) the pitcher pitched three or more innings
 Innings pitched: outs recorded while pitching divided by three (partial innings are conventionally recorded as, e.g., "5.2" or "7.1", the last digit actually representing thirds, not tenths, of an inning)
 Strikeouts: times pitching three strikes to a batter
 Winning percentage: wins divided by decisions (wins plus losses)
 Earned run average (ERA): runs allowed, excluding those resulting from fielding errors, per nine innings pitched
The basic fielding statistics include:
 Putouts: times the fielder catches a fly ball, tags or forces out a runner, or otherwise directly effects an out
 Assists: times a putout by another fielder was recorded following the fielder touching the ball
 Errors: times the fielder fails to make a play that should have been made with common effort, and the batting team benefits as a result
 Total chances: putouts plus assists plus errors
 Fielding average: successful chances (putouts plus assists) divided by total chances

Among the many other statistics that are kept are those collectively known as situational statistics. For example, statistics can indicate which specific pitchers a certain batter performs best against. If a given situation statistically favors a certain batter, the manager of the fielding team may be more likely to change pitchers or have the pitcher intentionally walk the batter in order to face one who is less likely to succeed.

Sabermetrics 
Sabermetrics refers to the field of baseball statistical study and the development of new statistics and analytical tools. The term is also used to refer directly to new statistics themselves. The term was coined around 1980 by one of the field's leading proponents, Bill James, and derives from the Society for American Baseball Research (SABR).

The growing popularity of sabermetrics since the early 1980s has brought more attention to two batting statistics that sabermetricians argue are much better gauges of a batter's skill than batting average:
 On-base percentage (OBP) measures a batter's ability to get on base. It is calculated by taking the sum of the batter's successes in getting on base (hits plus walks plus hit by pitches) and dividing that by the batter's total plate appearances (at bats plus walks plus hit by pitches plus sacrifice flies), except for sacrifice bunts.
 Slugging percentage (SLG) measures a batter's ability to hit for power. It is calculated by taking the batter's total bases (one per each single, two per double, three per triple, and four per home run) and dividing that by the batter's at bats.

Some of the new statistics devised by sabermetricians have gained wide use:
 On-base plus slugging (OPS) measures a batter's overall ability. It is calculated by adding the batter's on-base percentage and slugging percentage.
 Walks plus hits per inning pitched (WHIP) measures a pitcher's ability at preventing hitters from reaching base. It is calculated by adding the number of walks and hits a pitcher surrendered, then dividing by the number of innings pitched.
Wins Above Replacement (WAR) measures number of additional wins his team has achieved above the number of expected team wins if that player were substituted with a replacement-level player.

Popularity and cultural impact 

Writing in 1919, philosopher Morris Raphael Cohen described baseball as the national religion of the US. In the words of sports columnist Jayson Stark, baseball has long been "a unique paragon of American culture"—a status he sees as devastated by the steroid abuse scandal. Baseball has an important place in other national cultures as well: Scholar Peter Bjarkman describes "how deeply the sport is ingrained in the history and culture of a nation such as Cuba, [and] how thoroughly it was radically reshaped and nativized in Japan."

In the United States 
The major league game in the United States was originally targeted toward a middle-class, white-collar audience: relative to other spectator pastimes, the National League's set ticket price of 50 cents in 1876 was high, while the location of playing fields outside the inner city and the workweek daytime scheduling of games were also obstacles to a blue-collar audience. A century later, the situation was very different. With the rise in popularity of other team sports with much higher average ticket prices—football, basketball, and hockey—professional baseball had become among the most blue-collar-oriented of leading American spectator sports.

Overall, baseball has a large following in the United States; a 2006 poll found that nearly half of Americans are fans. In the late 1900s and early 2000s, baseball's position compared to football in the United States moved in contradictory directions. In 2008, MLB set a revenue record of $6.5 billion, matching the NFL's revenue for the first time in decades. A new MLB revenue record of more than $10 billion was set in 2017. On the other hand, the percentage of American sports fans polled who named baseball as their favorite sport was 9%, compared to pro football at 37%. In 1985, the respective figures were pro football 24%, baseball 23%. Because there are so many more major league games played, there is no comparison in overall attendance. In 2008, total attendance at major league games was the second-highest in history: 78.6 million, 0.7% off the record set the previous year. The following year, amid the U.S. recession, attendance fell by 6.6% to 73.4 million. Eight years later, it dropped under 73 million. Attendance at games held under the Minor League Baseball umbrella set a record in 2008, with 43.3 million. While MLB games have not drawn the same national TV viewership as football games, MLB games are dominant in teams' local markets and regularly lead all programs in primetime in their markets during the summer.

Caribbean 
Since the early 1980s, the Dominican Republic, in particular the city of San Pedro de Macorís, has been the major leagues' primary source of foreign talent. In 2017, 83 of the 868 players on MLB Opening Day rosters (and disabled lists) were from the country. Among other Caribbean countries and territories, a combined 97 MLB players were born in Venezuela, Cuba, and Puerto Rico. Hall-of-Famer Roberto Clemente remains one of the greatest national heroes in Puerto Rico's history. While baseball has long been the island's primary athletic pastime, its once well-attended professional winter league has declined in popularity since 1990, when young Puerto Rican players began to be included in the major leagues' annual first-year player draft. In Cuba, where baseball is by every reckoning the national sport, the national team overshadows the city and provincial teams that play in the top-level domestic leagues.

Asia 

In Asia, baseball is among the most popular sports in Japan and South Korea. In Japan, where baseball is inarguably the leading spectator team sport, combined revenue for the twelve teams in Nippon Professional Baseball (NPB), the body that oversees both the Central and Pacific Leagues, was estimated at $1 billion in 2007. Total NPB attendance for the year was approximately 20 million. While in the preceding two decades, MLB attendance grew by 50 percent and revenue nearly tripled, the comparable NPB figures were stagnant. There are concerns that MLB's growing interest in acquiring star Japanese players will hurt the game in their home country. Revenue figures are not released for the country's amateur system. Similarly, according to one official pronouncement, the sport's governing authority "has never taken into account attendance ... because its greatest interest has always been the development of athletes". In Taiwan, baseball is one of the most widely spectated sports, with the origins dating back to Japanese rule.

Among children 
, Little League Baseball oversees leagues with close to 2.4 million participants in over 80 countries. The number of players has fallen since the 1990s, when 3 million children took part in Little League Baseball annually. Babe Ruth League teams have over 1 million participants. According to the president of the International Baseball Federation, between 300,000 and 500,000 women and girls play baseball around the world, including Little League and the introductory game of Tee Ball.

A varsity baseball team is an established part of physical education departments at most high schools and colleges in the United States. In 2015, nearly half a million high schoolers and over 34,000 collegians played on their schools' baseball teams. By early in the 20th century, intercollegiate baseball was Japan's leading sport. Today, high school baseball in particular is immensely popular there. The final rounds of the two annual tournaments—the National High School Baseball Invitational Tournament in the spring, and the even more important National High School Baseball Championship in the summer—are broadcast around the country. The tournaments are known, respectively, as Spring Koshien and Summer Koshien after the 55,000-capacity stadium where they are played. In Cuba, baseball is a mandatory part of the state system of physical education, which begins at age six. Talented children as young as seven are sent to special district schools for more intensive training—the first step on a ladder whose acme is the national baseball team.

In popular culture 

Baseball has had a broad impact on popular culture, both in the United States and elsewhere. Dozens of English-language idioms have been derived from baseball; in particular, the game is the source of a number of widely used sexual euphemisms. The first networked radio broadcasts in North America were of the 1922 World Series: famed sportswriter Grantland Rice announced play-by-play from New York City's Polo Grounds on WJZ–Newark, New Jersey, which was connected by wire to WGY–Schenectady, New York, and WBZ–Springfield, Massachusetts. The baseball cap has become a ubiquitous fashion item not only in the United States and Japan, but also in countries where the sport itself is not particularly popular, such as the United Kingdom.

Baseball has inspired many works of art and entertainment. One of the first major examples, Ernest Thayer's poem "Casey at the Bat", appeared in 1888. A wry description of the failure of a star player in what would now be called a "clutch situation", the poem became the source of vaudeville and other staged performances, audio recordings, film adaptations, and an opera, as well as a host of sequels and parodies in various media. There have been many baseball movies, including the Academy Award–winning The Pride of the Yankees (1942) and the Oscar nominees The Natural (1984) and Field of Dreams (1989). The American Film Institute's selection of the ten best sports movies includes The Pride of the Yankees at number 3 and Bull Durham (1988) at number 5. Baseball has provided thematic material for hits on both stage—the Adler–Ross musical Damn Yankees—and record—George J. Gaskin's "Slide, Kelly, Slide", Simon and Garfunkel's "Mrs. Robinson", and John Fogerty's "Centerfield". The baseball-inspired comedic sketch "Who's on First?", popularized by Abbott and Costello in 1938, quickly became famous. Six decades later, Time named it the best comedy routine of the 20th century.

Literary works connected to the game include the short fiction of Ring Lardner and novels such as Bernard Malamud's The Natural (the source for the movie), Robert Coover's The Universal Baseball Association, Inc., J. Henry Waugh, Prop., John Grisham's Calico Joe and W. P. Kinsella's Shoeless Joe (the source for Field of Dreams). Baseball's literary canon also includes the beat reportage of Damon Runyon; the columns of Grantland Rice, Red Smith, Dick Young, and Peter Gammons; and the essays of Roger Angell. Among the celebrated nonfiction books in the field are Lawrence S. Ritter's The Glory of Their Times, Roger Kahn's The Boys of Summer, and Michael Lewis's Moneyball. The 1970 publication of major league pitcher Jim Bouton's tell-all chronicle Ball Four is considered a turning point in the reporting of professional sports.

Baseball has also inspired the creation of new cultural forms. Baseball cards were introduced in the late 19th century as trade cards. A typical example featured an image of a baseball player on one side and advertising for a business on the other. In the early 1900s they were produced widely as promotional items by tobacco and confectionery companies. The 1930s saw the popularization of the modern style of baseball card, with a player photograph accompanied on the rear by statistics and biographical data. Baseball cards—many of which are now prized collectibles—are the source of the much broader trading card industry, involving similar products for different sports and non-sports-related fields.

Modern fantasy sports began in 1980 with the invention of Rotisserie League Baseball by New York writer Daniel Okrent and several friends. Participants in a Rotisserie league draft notional teams from the list of active MLB players and play out an entire imaginary season with game outcomes based on the players' latest real-world statistics. Rotisserie-style play quickly became a phenomenon. Now known more generically as fantasy baseball, it has inspired similar games based on an array of different sports. The field boomed with increasing Internet access and new fantasy sports-related websites. By 2008, 29.9 million people in the United States and Canada were playing fantasy sports, spending $800 million on the hobby. The burgeoning popularity of fantasy baseball is also credited with the increasing attention paid to sabermetrics—first among fans, only later among baseball professionals.

Derivative games 
Informal variations of baseball have popped up over time, with games like corkball reflecting local traditions and allowing the game to be played in diverse environments. Two variations of baseball, softball and Baseball5, are internationally governed alongside baseball by the World Baseball Softball Confederation.

British baseball 

American professional baseball teams toured Britain in 1874 and 1889, and had a great effect on similar sports in Britain. In Wales and Merseyside, a strong community game had already developed with skills and plays more in keeping with the American game and the Welsh began to informally adopt the name "baseball" (Pêl Fas), to reflect the American style. By the 1890s, calls were made to follow the success of other working class sports (like Rugby in Wales and Soccer in Merseyside) and adopt a distinct set of rules and bureaucracy. During the 1892 season rules for the game of "baseball" were agreed and the game was officially codified.

Finnish baseball 

Finnish baseball, known as pesäpallo, is a combination of traditional ball-batting team games and North American baseball, invented by Lauri "Tahko" Pihkala in the 1920s. The basic idea of pesäpallo is similar to that of baseball: the offense tries to score by hitting the ball successfully and running through the bases, while the defense tries to put the batter and runners out. One of the most important differences between pesäpallo and baseball is that the ball is pitched vertically, which makes hitting the ball, as well as controlling the power and direction of the hit, much easier. This gives the offensive game more variety, speed, and tactical aspects compared to baseball.

See also 

 Baseball awards
 Baseball clothing and equipment
 List of organized baseball leagues
 Women in baseball

Related sports

 Baseball5, the official ball-only version of baseball
 Brännboll (Scandinavian bat-and-ball game)
 Cricket
 Comparison of baseball and cricket
 Lapta (game) (Russian bat-and-ball game)
 Oină (Romanian bat-and-ball game)
 Pesäpallo, also known as Finnish baseball (a demonstration sport at the 1952 Summer Olympics)
 Rounders
 Snow baseball (with similar rules played in India during winters)
 Stickball
 Stoop ball
 Vitilla
 Wiffle ball

Citations

General and cited sources

Further reading 
 Dickson, Paul. The Dickson Baseball Dictionary, 3rd ed. (W. W. Norton, 2009). .
 Fitts, Robert K. Remembering Japanese Baseball: An Oral History of the Game (Southern Illinois University Press, 2005). .
 Gillette, Gary, and Pete Palmer (eds.). The ESPN Baseball Encyclopedia, 5th ed. (Sterling, 2008). .
 Peterson, Robert. Only the Ball Was White: A History of Legendary Black Players and All-Black Professional Teams (Oxford University Press, 1992 [1970]). .
 Reaves, Joseph A. Taking in a Game: A History of Baseball in Asia (Bison, 2004). .
 Ward, Geoffrey C., and Ken Burns. Baseball: An Illustrated History (Alfred A. Knopf, 1996). .

External links 

 World Baseball Softball Confederation
 "Baseball". Encyclopædia Britannica Online.
 Baseball Prospectus
 Society for American Baseball Research
 Mister Baseball European baseball news
 Baseball Heritage Museum at League Park in Cleveland, Ohio
 "Perils of Base Ball Playing", historical perspective on statistics of baseball injuries, Scientific American, July 13, 1878, p. 21

 
Baseball terminology
1846 introductions
American culture
Articles containing video clips
Ball and bat games
Sports originating in England
Sports originating in the United States
Summer Olympic sports
Team sports
Turf sports